Babe, I Hate to Go is a 2017 Canadian documentary film directed by Andrew Moir. The film centres on Delroy Dunkley, a migrant worker from Jamaica who works on a farm in Southwestern Ontario to support his family, but is trying to shield them from his own diagnosis with cancer.

The film premiered at the Hot Docs Canadian International Documentary Festival in 2017, before being distributed primarily on the Canadian Broadcasting Corporation's Short Docs web platform.

The film received a Canadian Screen Award nomination for Best Short Documentary Film at the 6th Canadian Screen Awards.

A full-length version of the film, Don't Come Searching, was released in 2022.

References

External links
 
Babe, I Hate to Go at the Canadian Broadcasting Corporation

2017 films
2017 short documentary films
Canadian short documentary films
2010s English-language films
2010s Canadian films
Documentary films about Black Canadians